Radio Padrino or Padrino Radio is a Bosnian local commercial radio station, broadcasting from Trebinje, Bosnia and Herzegovina. This radio station broadcasts a variety of programs such as pop and rock music, talk shows and local news.

Radio Padrino was established in February 2018 by the company HP media group d.o.o. Trebinje.

Since 20 April 2018, the program is mainly produced in Serbian at one FM frequency (Trebinje ) and it is available in the city of Trebinje as well as in nearby municipalities of East Herzegovina and in neighboring Montenegro and Croatia.

Estimated number of listeners of Radio Padrino is around 25,871.

Frequencies
 Trebinje

See also 
 List of radio stations in Bosnia and Herzegovina
 Korona Radio 1
 Korona Radio 2
 Radio Trebinje
 Radio Bileća
 Radio Nevesinje
 Radio Gacko

References

External links 
 www.radiopadrino.com
 www.radiostanica.ba
 www.fmscan.org
 Communications Regulatory Agency of Bosnia and Herzegovina

Trebinje
Radio stations established in 2018
Trebinje